Wielert's, built in 1873, was once a famous beer garden in the Over-the-Rhine neighborhood of Cincinnati, Ohio. OTR Predevelopment, a subsidiary of 3cdc bought this property along with others on Vine St. on July 30, 2010. (Hamilton County Auditor)

References

German-American culture in Cincinnati
History of Cincinnati
Restaurants in Cincinnati
Commercial buildings completed in 1873
Beer gardens in the United States
Beer in Ohio